Alex Bolt and Bradley Mousley were the defending champions but only Mousley chose to defend his title, partnering Akira Santillan. Mousley lost in the quarterfinals to Evan Hoyt and Wu Tung-lin.

Hoyt and Wu won the title after defeating Jeremy Beale and Thomas Fancutt 7–6(7–5), 5–7, [10–8] in the final.

Seeds

Draw

References
 Main Draw

Canberra Tennis International - Men's Doubles
2018 in Australian tennis
2018